Vichumbe is a village in Panvel Taluka situated in New Panvel, Raigad district in the Indian State of Maharashtra. The village of Vichumbe comes under the Cidco smart city NAINA project.

Education
There are many Institutes nearby to this village
 Pillais Institute of Information Technology, Engineering, Media Studies & Research
 St. Josephs High School, New Panvel (EAST)
 Changu Kana Thakur School and Jr College
 DAV Public School
 DD Vispute College of Pharmacy (B.Pharm.)

Hospitals
Life Care Multi Speciality Hospital

Transport 
The nearest railway station is accessible through New Panvel called Panvel Railway Station.

Buses are available from Usarli Khurd to Panvel Railway Station (East).

References 

 Census of India

Talukas in Maharashtra
Villages in Raigad district